Daawat-e-Ishq is a 2014 Indian Hindi-language romantic comedy film directed by Habib Faisal, and produced by Aditya Chopra under the banner of Yash Raj Films. It stars  Parineeti Chopra and Aditya Roy Kapur. The soundtrack was composed by Sajid–Wajid.

The film was released on 19 September 2014, to mostly positive reviews. The Hindu said Daawat-e-Ishq was a "potent recipe", and Times of India gave it four stars out of five. The film collected  at the box office in its first week run.

Plot
Gulrez "Gullu" Qadir (Parineeti Chopra) lives in a lower-middle-class Hyderabadi mohalla and works at a mall as a shoe-sales girl with dreams of going to America. She lives along with her father Abdul Qadir (Anupam Kher) who is looking for a suitable match for her but can't afford to pay big dowry, which will only get her some uncouth crude fellow. This doesn't make Gullu lose her optimism and humour. In her quest to find her Mr. Universe, she falls in love with Amjad (Karan Wahi) and they decide to get married. Things do not work out as Amjad's parents ask for Rs. 80 lakhs in dowry. Enraged, Gullu plans to trap a dowry-hungry groom under IPC 498A (dowry act) and to recover lacs of money from him to fulfill her dream of going to America.

She and her father go to Lucknow with fake identities and intercept the manager of a renowned restaurant "Big Boss Haidari Kebab," known as Tariq "Taru" Haider (Aditya Roy Kapur). They choose Tariq as their target and when Tariq's parents ask for dowry from Abdul, she secretly records the entire conversation. During the three days before the wedding, Taru and Gullu get to know each other and Gullu starts falling for Taru. To her surprise, Taru gives her Rs. 40 lakhs in cash from his own savings, which his father asked for dowry. This way, Taru's father can maintain his conventions. And when Gullu's father gives Taru's father the 40 lakhs, it will not have been a real dowry.

Gullu still sticks with her plan of drugging Taru on their wedding night and runs away with all the cash — also recovering 40 lakhs more from Taru's family via a police officer, blackmailing him to file charges under section 498A. Taru decides to take revenge as he finds out her real identity. Meanwhile, Gullu and Abdul start preparing to leave for America. Gullu feels remorseful and guilty about scamming an honest person and decides to return all the money. When they reach the railway station to board a train to Lucknow, Gullu is confronted by Taru. Gullu returns all the money and confesses her love for him. They reunite and plan a real wedding without any dowry. Meanwhile, Amjad realises his mistake after seeing their wedding video and confronts his parents for demanding a dowry. Gullu opens a shoe shop in a mall named "GULLU".

Cast
 Aditya Roy Kapur as Tariq "Taru" Haidar
 Parineeti Chopra as Gulrez "Gullu" Qadir / Sania Habibullah
 Anupam Kher as Abdul Qadir / Shahriyar Habibullah
 Karan Wahi as Amjad
 Sumit Gaddi as Neeraj
 Poojan Parikh as Tariq Haider's Dad
 Ritesh M M Shukla as Haider staff 6th

Production
Daawat-e-Ishq is the second collaboration between Habib Faisal and Parineeti Chopra after Ishaqzaade. Television actor Karan Wahi made his silver-screen debut with this film. Anupam Kher was to star. The film was extensively shot in Hyderabad and Lucknow.

Choreography
The choreographers are:
 Rekha and Chinni Prakash for the song "Daawat-e-Ishq" and "Rangreli".
 Bosco-Caesar for the song "Shayrana".
 Adil Shaikh for the songs "Mannat" and "Jaadu Tone Waaliyan".

Soundtrack

The full soundtrack was released by YRF Music on 18 July 2014.

Box office
The movie was supposed to release on 5 September but was postponed to 19 September due to avoid competition with Mary Kom.

Awards and nominations

References

External links
 

2014 films
2014 romantic comedy films
2010s Hindi-language films
Yash Raj Films films
Films about social issues in India
Comedy films based on actual events
Films set in Hyderabad, India
Films about women in India
Films shot in Lucknow